Kobyla Głowa may refer to the following places in Poland:
Kobyla Głowa, Lower Silesian Voivodeship in Gmina Ciepłowody, Ząbkowice Śląskie County in Lower Silesian Voivodeship (SW Poland)
Kobyla Głowa or Czuby, a peak in the Little Beskids
Kobyla Głowa, a peak in the Maków Beskids